The Aero AT-1, a.k.a. Antoniewski AT-1, is a two-seat, low wing, ultra-light sport aircraft, developed by Tomasz Antoniewski, manufactured in Poland by Aero AT in ready-to-fly certificated form and as a kitplane.

Design and development

Antoniewski designed the AT-1, using the  Jodel D.9 Bébé  as a starting point, for his diploma thesis at the Faculty of Power and Aeronautical Engineering of the Warsaw University of Technology.

Retaining most of the fuselage structure, the wings were replaced with shortened SZD-30 Pirat wings of  span. The  heavier wings required structural modifications to the fuselage and the adoption of undercarriage legs from a PZL-126 Mrówka, main landing gear wheels from the SZD-51 Junior and tail landing gear from the PZL-104 Wilga.

Construction began at Yalo in 1987 and by December 1989 the aircraft was almost ready, with only the engine covers missing, painting and other small parts required. The first short flights over Bemowo airport were carried out then. A proper, but still unofficial, flight was carried out in July 1990, but it was not until 9 December 1990 that the first AT-1 was officially flown by Maciej Aksler.

The AT-1 is a single-seat wooden low wing monoplane, with fabric and plywood skinning. Initially flown with an open cockpit a canopy was later installed. Controls are entirely conventional, including a small fin with large rudderand similar construction to the wings. The tailwheel undercarriage has single leaf main undercarriage legs.

Operational history

Initially used as intended, for recreational flying, the AT-1 was also used for banner-towing and forest fire-patrol from 1993 to 1996. The original AT-1 is currently stationed at the Pilski Aero Club.

Specifications

References

External links
 
Low-wing aircraft
Homebuilt aircraft
1990s Polish civil utility aircraft
AT-1
Single-engined tractor aircraft